Theodore I may refer to:

 Patriarch Theodore I of Alexandria, Greek Patriarch of Alexandria (607–609)
 Pope Theodore I (died 649)
 Theodore I Calliopas, Exarch of Ravenna (643–645 and 653 – c. 666)
 Patriarch Theodore I of Constantinople (ruled 677–679)
 Theodore I Laskaris, Emperor of Nicaea (1204–1221 or 1205–1222)
 Theodore II Laskaris, Emperor of Nicaea, 1254–1258
 Teodor I Muzaka, Albanian despot
 Theodore I Palaiologos, Despot of the Morea in 1383-1407
 Tewodros I of Ethiopia, Emperor of Ethiopia (1413–1414), sometimes known as Theodore I
 Theodore I of Corsica, King of Corsica (1736)